Elections to the European Parliament were held in Poland on 13 June 2004. 20.87% of eligible citizens voted; of these, 97.33% of the votes cast were valid. The elections resulted in a heavy defeat for the governing Alliance of the Democratic Left and Labor Union parties, although the very low turnout makes a direct comparison with national election results difficult. As expected the most successful party was the Civic Platform. Second place was taken by the strongly anti-EU League of Polish Families.

The radical populist Self-Defence of the Republic of Poland, which some opinion polls had predicted would come second, came fourth after the Law and Justice party. The election results were a success for Social Democracy of Poland, which managed to cross the required 5% threshold, and the Freedom Union, which got over twice the expected percentage of votes.

Opinion polls

Results

Elected members

Civic Platform 

 Jerzy Buzek, ex-prime minister, professor of technical sciences
 Zdzisław Chmielewski, historian, rector of Szczecin University
 Małgorzata Handzlik, publisher and journalist
 Stanisław Jałowiecki, sociologist and politician
 Filip Kaczmarek, historian and journalist
 Bogdan Klich, expert on international politics
 Barbara Kudrycka, professor of law
 Janusz Lewandowski, economist, ex-minister of privatisation
 Jan Olbrycht, politician, ex-mayor of Cieszyn
 Jacek Saryusz-Wolski, economist, former Poland-EU negotiator
 Jacek Protasiewicz, philologist and politician
 Bogusław Sonik, lawyer and politician
 Zbigniew Zaleski, professor of psychology
 Tadeusz Zwiefka, journalist

League of Polish Families 

 Filip Adwent, physician and author
 Sylwester Chruszcz, architect and politician
 Maciej Giertych, politician and publicist
 Dariusz Grabowski, economist, politician and businessman
 Urszula Krupa, doctor of medicine, journalist
 Mirosław Piotrowski, professor of history
 Bogdan Pęk, zootechnologist and politician
 Bogusław Rogalski, historian, farmer and political activist
 Witold Tomczak, physician and politician
 Wojciech Wierzejski, politician and sociologist

Law and Justice 

 Adam Bielan, politician
 Anna Fotyga, international trade expert, vice-mayor of Gdańsk (2002–2004)
 Mieczysław Janowski, doctor of technical sciences, local activist
 Michał Kamiński, journalist and politician
 Marcin Libicki, arts historian and politician
 Wojciech Roszkowski, historian, professor of politics
 Konrad Szymanski, lawyer, journalist and politician

Self-Defense of the Republic of Poland 

 Marek Czarnecki, lawyer, journalist and politician
 Ryszard Czarnecki, historian, journalist and politician
 Bogdan Golik, animal doctor and business adviser
 Wiesław Kuc, economist and agriculture expert
 Jan Masiel, psychiatrist and business adviser
 Leopold Rutowicz, economist and businessman

Democratic Left Alliance-Labor Union 

 Adam Gierek, politician, son of Edward Gierek, communist leader of Poland in the 1970s
 Lidia Geringer d'Oedenberg, economist and journalist
 Bogusław Liberadzki, economist, ex-minister of transport
 Marek Siwiec, journalist, politician, president's advisor
 Andrzej Szejna, economist, politician

Freedom Union 

 Bronisław Geremek, historian and politician, ex-minister of foreign affairs
 Jan Kulakowski, journalist, ex Poland-EU negotiator
 Janusz Onyszkiewicz, mathematician and politician, ex-minister of defence
 Grazyna Staniszewska, politician, senator

Polish People's Party 

 Zbigniew Kuzmiuk, politician, chairman of PSL parliamentary caucus
 Zdzisław Podkański, historian and politician, vice chairman of PSL, ex-vice minister of culture
 Czesław Siekierski, agriculture economist, ex-vice minister of agriculture
 Janusz Wojciechowski, lawyer and politician, chairman of PSL since March 2004

Social Democratic Party of Poland 

 Genowefa Grabowska, professor of international law, senator
 Józef Pinior, lawyer, economist and politician
 Dariusz Rosati, professor of economics, ex-minister of foreign affairs

Independent 

 Paweł Piskorski, politician, ex-mayor of Warsaw

See also
 Politics of Poland
 Poland (European Parliament constituency)

References
 Obwieszczenie PKW z dnia 15 VI 2004 r., Dz.U. Nr 137, poz. 1460.

External links
 European Election News by European Election Law Association (Eurela)

Poland
2004
History of Poland (1989–present)
2004 elections in Poland